Ute Richter (born 14 July 1958) is a German athlete. She competed in the women's javelin throw at the 1980 Summer Olympics.

References

External links
 

1958 births
Living people
People from Pirna
People from Bezirk Dresden
German female javelin throwers
Sportspeople from Saxony
Olympic athletes of East Germany
Athletes (track and field) at the 1980 Summer Olympics
20th-century German women